Tanjiang is a town located in Fengshun County, Meizhou City, Guangdong Province, China. , it has one residential community and 18 villages under its administration.

See also 
List of township-level divisions of Guangdong

References

External links 
Official website of the Fengshun County Government

Towns in Guangdong
Fengshun County